Apotactis is a genus of moth in the family Gelechiidae.

Species
 Apotactis drimylota Meyrick, 1918
 Apotactis citrophila Meyrick, 1933

References

Gelechiinae
Taxa named by Edward Meyrick
Moth genera